Lion Ferry was a Swedish ferry company which operated passenger and freight ferry services in Scandinavia and North America.

History
In 1960 The Prins Bertil enters service between Halmstad and Aarhus.
Lion Ferry acquired Norwegian ferry operator Europafergen in 1965.
It commenced the Portland - Yarmouth route operated by the Prince of Fundy in 1970 and closed in 1976.
In 1973 it started a joint venture with Irish Shipping to form Irish Continental Line.
Lion Ferry AB acquired by Stena Line in 1985.
Lion Ferry commences Karlskrona - Gdynia route in 1995.

In 1997 Lion Ferry services were rebranded as Stena Line.

Routes
Lion Ferry operated various routes during its 39 years in operation.
 Halmstad - Aarhus
 Halmstad - Grenå
 Varberg - Grenå
 Karlskrona - Gdynia
 Portland - Yarmouth
 Bremerhaven - Harwich (Marketed as Prinzen Line)

Fleet
Lion Ferry operated many vessels during its time in operation.

References

Ferry companies of Sweden
Defunct companies of Sweden